Philippe Poissonnier (born 7 June 1951) is a French former professional racing cyclist. He rode in one edition of the Tour de France, one edition of the Giro d'Italia and four editions of the Vuelta a España.

Major results
1981
 9th Le Samyn
1982
 1st Stage 6 Deutschland Tour
1984
 7th Binche–Tournai–Binche
 8th Overall Étoile de Bessèges
 8th Le Samyn

Grand Tour general classification results timeline

References

External links

1951 births
Living people
French male cyclists
Sportspeople from Lille
Cyclists from Hauts-de-France